Zacharie Jacques Théodore Allemand (1 May 1762, in Port-Louis – 2 March 1826, in Toulon) was a French admiral.

Biography

Early career 
Allemand was born to a captain of the East Indian Company. Orphaned at an early age, he started his sailing career at 12 as an apprentice on Superbe, an East Indiaman. In 1778, at the outbreak of the American War of Independence, he volunteered for Navy service of Sévère, in Suffren's squadron. By the end of the war, Allemand had risen to lieutenant de frégate and served on Annibal. He later went on to serve on the fluyts Baleine and Outarde in the Indian Ocean.

In late 1786, Allemand returned to France to benefit from a reform of the Navy by which he could obtain a permanent commission of sous-lieutenant de vaisseau for his service. In this capacity, he served on a number of frigates in the Caribbean and off America.

French Revolution and First Empire
Allemand was promoted to full lieutenant in 1792, and had risen to captain by the outbreak of the War of the First Coalition in 1793. He was given command of a light squadron, with his flag on the frigate Carmagnole. Engaging in commerce raiding, he also captured the frigate Thames, helpless after her fight against Uranie the previous day, making the first capture of a Royal Navy ship of the war and thus being heralded as a hero by the National Convention.

In 1794, Allemand was given command of the 74-gun Duquesne and carried out raids against British commerce outposts in Sierra Leone and Guinea, capturing 21 merchantmen.

After returning to the Mediterranean, Allemand was incorporated in Admiral Martin's squadron. Martin and Allemand disliked each other, and their relations soured to the point where Allemand was nearly relieved of duty for insubordination after the battle of Cape Noli.

Promoted to chef de division (rear admiral), Allemand took command of a division in Richery's squadron. He was sent with two ships of the line and one frigate to raid British outposts in Labrador, and on his way back captured a convoy worth 80 million francs, making 1,800 prisoners including the Governor General of Canada, his family, and a number of officers, returning to Brest in November 1796. Upon his arrival, Allemand was relieved of duty for "brutality towards his crews" and "rudeness towards his passengers".

Reinstated, Allemand took command of the 74-gun Tyrannicide and took part in the Cruise of Bruix. On 11 July 1799, Bruix was replaced by Latouche Tréville, who again relieved Allemand from duty for "rudeness" in 1800. The next year, Allemand commanded the Aigle.

After serving in office duties in 1802, Allemand received command of the Magnanime, in Admiral Missiessy's squadron, on which he departed on 11 January 1805 for the Saint-Domingue expedition. Upon the return of the squadron to Rochefort, Missiessy was disgraced and fell ill, giving effective command to Allemand.

On 22 June, Allemand was officially made chief of the squadron, and tasked with a diversion manoeuver that would bring him to rejoin Villeneuve's squadron in Ferrol: Allemand's expedition of 1805 was a vast commerce raid that led to the capture of over a hundred merchantmen and of the 64-gun HMS Calcutta. Allemand eluded the three squadrons sent to chase him, earning his division the nickname of "invisible squadron".

This success earned Allemand the consideration of Napoleon, in spite of severe notations from Decrès criticising his character. He was promoted to rear admiral on 1 January 1806.

In 1809, Allemand was vice-admiral and commanded the squadrons of Brest and Rochefort. His insufficient defensive dispositions allowed the British to launch a fireship attack on his squadron at anchor, starting the Battle of the Basque Roads. Allemand reacted to the attack  merely by giving his captains their liberty of manoeuver and concentrating on the safety of his own ship, the 120-gun Océan, which sailed to the haven of the river Charente after throwing part of her artillery overboard. The resulting loss of four ships and two frigates was blamed on captains, four of whom were court-martialed with one relieved of duty and one executed by firing squad, but Allemand's role was never questioned, much to the outrage of the officers. Allemand was quickly transferred to the command of the Mediterranean fleet to prevent possibility of his hearing by the court of Rochefort.

On 15 August 1810, he was made a Count of the Empire.

In Toulon, Allemand commanded a squadron that remained at anchor until the end of the Empire. He engaged in a number of rows, fights and even brawls with his officers, and having very bad relations with the maritime prefect Emeriau.

In 1812, Allemand succeeded in bringing several warships from Lorient where they were trapped to Brest in order to form a larger French fleet.

In 1813, Allemand was made aid to Missiessy in Flessingue, but violently refused the office, arguing that he could now serve only as chief commander. This last outburst led to his disgrace and he was forcibly retired.

Restoration
Allemand attempted to return to Navy service during the Bourbon Restoration, but to no avail. In May 1814, he was made a member of the Académie des Sciences, which he presided from August. In June, he was made a Knight of the Order of Saint Louis.

During the Hundred Days, in March 1815, Allemand offered his services to Napoleon, but Decrès refused to reinstate him. Allemand was the only general officer to be thus rebuked.

In the following years, Allemand devoted his efforts to Freemasonry, creating an ephemeral dissident Order named "Suprême Conseil du Prado", of which he proclaimed himself "Souverain Grand Commandeur"

Allemand died in Toulon on 2 March 1826.

Notes

French Navy admirals
1762 births
1828 deaths
Members of the French Academy of Sciences
French naval commanders of the Napoleonic Wars
Knights of the Order of Saint Louis